= Rauma Ice Pack =

Finnish rugby club

- Full name: Rauma Ice Pack
- Nickname: Ice Pack
- Location: Rauma, Finland
- Chairman: Markus Helmle
- Coach: (France) Pierre-Yves Guiban (player-coach)
Team kit

Rauma Ice Pack is a Finnish rugby club in Rauma.

In the 2012 Division 1 season, Rauma Ice Pack won the western regional pool and advanced to the semi-finals, where they lost narrowly to OYUS (Oulu), 17–19.
